James Judson Lovelace Jr. (born September 22, 1948) is a retired lieutenant general in the United States Army.

Early life and education
Lovelace was born in Richmond, Virginia, in 1948. He was commissioned a second lieutenant in Field Artillery upon graduation from the United States Military Academy in 1970.

Lovelace's military education includes the Field Artillery Basic and Advanced courses, the Armor Advanced Course, the Armed Forces Staff College, the Command and General Staff College, and the Naval War College. He holds a master's degree in Physical Education from Indiana University, a master's degree in Management from Salve Regina University, and a master's degree in National Security and Strategic Studies from the United States Naval War College.

Military career
Lovelace commanded batteries in the 2nd Infantry Division and the XVIII Airborne Corps Artillery. He also served as a Director of Instruction in the Department of Physical Education at the United States Military Academy, an aide-de-camp to the Commanding General of the First United States Army at Fort Meade, Maryland, a commander of the 5th Battalion, 8th Field Artillery, a 18th Field Artillery Brigade at Fort Bragg, North Carolina, and Deputy J-5 for Plans and Programs while assigned to Alaskan Command at Elmendorf Air Force Base, Alaska. He participated in Exercise Cobra Gold.

Lovelace assumed command of United States Army Central and Coalition Forces Land Component Command on December 18, 2007.

Dates of rank

Decorations and Badges

  Distinguished Service Medal with an Oak Leaf Cluster
  Defense Superior Service Medal
  Legion of Merit with 2 Oak Leaf Clusters
  Meritorious Service Medal with 4 Oak Leaf Clusters
  Army Commendation Medal with an Oak Leaf Cluster

Notes and references

1948 births
Living people
United States Military Academy alumni
Military personnel from Richmond, Virginia
Indiana University alumni
United States Army Command and General Staff College alumni
Salve Regina University alumni
Naval War College alumni
Recipients of the Distinguished Service Medal (US Army)
Recipients of the Legion of Merit
United States Army generals
Recipients of the Defense Superior Service Medal
Recipients of the Defense Distinguished Service Medal